Dinosaur Ridge is a ridge in Alberta, Canada.

Dinosaur Ridge was so named on account of its dinosaur-shaped outline.

References

Ridges of Alberta